Science Journal for Kids is an online scientific journal that publishes adaptations designed for children and teens of academic research papers that were originally published in high-impact peer-reviewed journals, as well as science teaching resources for teachers. It was established in 2015 and is published by a nonprofit 501(c)(3) organization of the same name. While most articles are published in English, occasionally papers will be translated into Spanish, French, German, and other languages.

Educational Impact
An impact assessment study in 2017 indicated that when exposed to these adapted articles, students scored significantly higher on a standardized exam measuring their understanding of scientific inquiry processes in comparison to a control group that used other science teaching materials.

References

External links

Science education journals
Creative Commons Attribution-licensed journals
Publications established in 2015
Multilingual journals
Continuous journals